Zahra Jishi is a Lebanese-American translator of Arabic literature. Among her translations are:
 Where Prophets Are Killed, a collection of three novellas by the Syrian-American author Lotfi Hadad. Co-translator - Reem Salem.
 The World Through the Eyes of Angels, a novel by the Iraqi-American writer Mahmoud Saeed. Co-translators: Samuel Salter and Rafah Abuinnab.

Jishi, Salter and Abuinnab won the 2010 Arkansas Arabic Translation Award for their translation of Angels.

See also 
 List of Arabic English translators

References

Arabic–English translators
American people of Lebanese descent
Living people
American women writers
American translators
Year of birth missing (living people)
21st-century American women